Sympiezomias kraatzi, is a species of weevil found in Sri Lanka.

Description
This species has a body length is about 7 mm. Body black. Head and prothorax with small sparse brownish grey scales. Head rugosely punctate and somewhat striolate. Forehead unusually flattened. Antennae reddish brown. There is a broad lateral stripe of large greenish-yellow scales on pronotum. Prothorax longer than broad, with very strongly rounded sides. Elytra with dense brownish-grey scales. Ventrum with thin greyish scales. Elytra, subtruncate at the base. Legs reddish brown. Corbels in hind legs clothed with long dense golden setae.

References 

Curculionidae
Insects of Sri Lanka
Beetles described in 1901